The Hedberg is performing arts campus and teaching facility that encompasses the historic Theatre Royal and the University of Tasmania (UTAS) through a collaborative partnership which also included the Australian and Tasmanian Governments.

History
UTAS acquired the 1926 Hedberg Brothers mechanics warehouse building and carpark on the corner of Campbell and Collins Streets, adjoining the Theatre Royal. In 2007, the Theatre Royal and UTAS approached the Tasmanian Government for funding a joint venture in the creation of a world-class performance precinct. Hobart’s Liminal Architecture team, as principal consultant, designed the building in collaboration with Singaporean architectural firm WOHA commencing in 2013. Archaeological work was completed in 2018 with consultation from the Tasmanian Heritage Council.

Built at a cost of $110m, the six-storey Hedberg building was officially opened by the Minister for the Arts, the Hon Elise Archer MP on 9 August 2021.

Theatre Royal

Facilities

Awards
Tasmanian Architecture Awards
 Tasmanian Architecture Medal (2022)
 Alan C Walker Award for Public Architecture (2022)
 Dirk Bolt Award for Urban Design (2022)
 Roy Sharrington Smith Award for Heritage (2022)
 COLORBOND Award for Steel Architecture (2022)
 Alexander North Award for Interior Architecture (2022)

See also
List of theatres in Hobart

References

Schools and Faculties of the University of Tasmania
Theatres in Hobart
Hobart
Education in Hobart
2021 establishments in Australia